Beerta is a village and former municipality with a population of 2,205 in the municipality of Oldambt in the province of Groningen in the Netherlands. In the 20th century, Beerta was a communist stronghold. In 1933, the municipal council was dismissed by the government, and was ruled by a  until 1935. Between 1982 and 1990, Beerta was the only municipality with a communist mayor.

Etymology 
Beerta means "place with houses" (English: neighboorhood; Frisian: buorren) The name was sometimes explained as relating to the 12th century  which was lost in a flood, however the monastery has been excavated in Hesel, East Frisia, Germany, in 1988.

History 
The Dollart is a bay in the Wadden Sea which was gradually expanding in size. Beerta was located on higher ground, and became a peninsula in the bay. The village dates from the 11th century.

The expanding Dollart implied that parts of Beerta were moved to higher ground. The Saint Bartholomew Church  dates from between 1506 and 1508, and was partially constructed using material of a 1462 church. The poldering of the Dollart resulted in a large areas of cultivated land, and in the mid-19th century, Beerta became a prosperous village with an elite of rich farmers. In 1840, it was home to 3,189 people.

The disparity in wealth resulted in the emergence of communists. In 1919, the first communists were elected to the municipal council.

Beerta was a separate municipality until 1990, when it merged with Finsterwolde and Nieuweschans to form a new municipality that was initially also called Beerta, but was renamed Reiderland one year later. In 2010, Reiderland merged into the new municipality of Oldambt.

Communism 
In 1919, the first communists were elected to the municipal council. Beerta became a Communist Party of the Netherlands (CPN) stronghold, and in 1933, it became the largest party. The CPN won again in the 1935 election, however the Social Democratic Workers' Party defected and formed a majority coalition with the other parties. Beerta would continue to be ruled by a coalition which excluded the CPN until 1966 when the communist party won the elections with an absolute majority.

In 1982, Hanneke Jagersma of the CPN became the mayor of Beerta. She was the first and only communist mayor in the Netherlands. In 1989, the CPN abandoned its Marxist–Leninist roots and merged into GroenLinks, however Jagersma did not join the new party. In 1990, Beerta was merged into Reiderland and Jagersma was no longer mayor.

Geography 
Beerta is situated in the municipality of Oldambt and the (historical) region of Oldambt in the east of the province of Groningen in the northeast of the Netherlands.

To the southwest of Beerta is Winschoten, to the west is Blauwestad, to the north is Finsterwolde, to the east is Bad Nieuweschans, to the southeast is Bellingwolde, and to the south is Blijham. North of Beerta is the Dollart, which is part of the Wadden Sea, to the west is the Oldambtmeer, and to the southeast are the rivers Westerwoldse Aa and Pekel Aa.

The former municipality of Beerta included the settlements Drieborg, Nieuw-Beerta, Nieuwe Statenzijl, Oudezijl, Oude Statenzijl, Ulsda, and Winschoterzijl.

Notable people 
 Hans Hateboer (born 1994), footballer
 Jurrie Koolhof (1960–2019), football striker and manager
 Harry Powers (1893–1932), American serial killer
 Marcus Slingenberg (1881–1941), politician and former minister of Social Affairs

Gallery

References

External links

Former municipalities of Groningen (province)
Oldambt (municipality)
Populated places in Groningen (province)